Hifehettumeh Neiy Karuna is a 1996 Maldivian drama film directed by Mohamed Rasheed. Produced by Aslam Rasheed under Slam Studio, the film stars Niuma Mohamed, Ibrahim Wisan and Arifa Ibrahim in pivotal roles.

Premise
Mohamed Ali (Abdul Raheem) adopted his niece Thasneem when his wife, Shakeela (Arifa Ibrahim) promised to take her as their own child since the couple are still not blessed with a child. She grew up with love and adore until Shakeela was found to be pregnant with a child.

Cast 
 Niuma Mohamed as Thasneem
 Arifa Ibrahim as Shakeela
 Abdul Raheem as Mohamed Ali
 Ibrahim Visan as Javid
 Mariyam Agisa as Baby
 Shelin as Thasneem (child)
 Enee as Thasneem (child)
 Nooma Ibrahim as Shehenaz
 Chilhiya Moosa Manik as Moosabe

Soundtrack

References

1996 drama films
Maldivian drama films
Films directed by Mohamed Rasheed
Dhivehi-language films